The list of ship launches in 1954 includes a chronological list of all ships launched in 1954.


See also

References

1954
Ship launches